Carl E. Guthrie (15 October 1905, St. Louis, Missouri - 23 April 1967, Los Angeles, California) was an American cinematographer.

Career

He began as an assistant cameraman, working on films such as Howard Hawks's Tiger Shark (1932) with Tony Gaudio. He was known for films such as Janie (1944), Hotel Berlin (1945), Christmas in Connecticut (1945), Caged (1950), Lady Godiva of Coventry (1955), Too Much, Too Soon (1958), House on Haunted Hill (1959), and Up Periscope (1959).

References

External links

American cinematographers
1905 births
1967 deaths
Artists from St. Louis